Wyvern  is a community in the Canadian province of Nova Scotia, located in  Cumberland County.

External links
 Wyvern on Destination Nova Scotia and at archive.org

Communities in Cumberland County, Nova Scotia
General Service Areas in Nova Scotia